Silverio Petrucci (died 1560) was a Roman Catholic prelate who served as Bishop of Muro Lucano (1541–1560).

Biography
On 27 June 1541, Silverio Petrucci was appointed during the papacy of Pope Paul III as Bishop of Muro Lucano.
He served as Bishop of Muro Lucano until his death in 1560.

References

External links and additional sources
 (for Chronology of Bishops) 
 (for Chronology of Bishops) 

15th-century Italian Roman Catholic bishops
Bishops appointed by Pope Paul III
1560 deaths